Panama Cricket Association is the official governing body of the sport of cricket in Panama. Panama Cricket Association is Panama's representative at the International Cricket Council and is an associate member and has been a member of that body since 2002. It is included in the ICC Americas region.

References

External links
Cricinfo-Panama

Cricket administration
 
Cricket